Swoop may refer to:

Entertainment
 Swoop (Australian band), a 1991 rock, funk and disco band
 Swoop (Belgian band), a 2001 party band
 Swoop (video game), 1982 clone of Galaxian
 The Swoop!, a novel by P. G. Wodehouse
 Swoop (Transformers), a Transformers character

Mascots
 Swoop (Eastern Michigan University), mascot for the Eastern Michigan Eagles
 Swoop (Eastern Washington University), mascot for Eastern Washington University's athletics
 Swoop (Miami University), mascot for Miami University
 Swoop (Philadelphia Eagles), mascot of the Philadelphia Eagles
 Swoop (University of Utah), mascot for the University of Utah
 Swoop the Silverhawk, a mascot for the South Bend Cubs

Other uses
 Swoop (airline), Canadian ultra low-cost airline
 Swoop (Mario), an enemy from the franchise
 Swoops, a candy manufactured by The Hershey Company
 Swoop bike
 Swooping (skydiving), a type of canopy piloting
 Solar Wind Observations Over the Poles of the Sun, an instrument aboard the Ulysses spacecraft

See also
 Swoope (surname)
 Słup (disambiguation), toponym that sounds like swoop